Ljubisa Dragi Rosanda Kocinac (born in Serbia in January 1947) is a mathematician and currently a Professor Emeritus at the University of Niš, Serbia. His research interests include aspects of topology, especially selection principles, topological games and coverings of topological spaces, and mathematical analysis. In particular, he introduced star selection principles.

He completed his PhD, focused on cardinal functions, at the University of Belgrade in 1983, under the supervision of Đuro Kurepa. Kocinac has published over 160 papers and four books in topology, real analysis and fields of sets.

He has actively promoted research on selection principles, as a fruitful collaborator and as an organizer of the first conferences in a series of international workshops titled Coverings, Selections and Games in Topology. The fourth of this series, held in Caserta, Italy, in June 2012 was dedicated to him on the occasion of his sixty-fifth birthday.

References

Living people
Serbian mathematicians
Academic staff of the University of Niš
University of Belgrade alumni
1947 births
Topologists